Mary Sweeney is an American director, writer, film editor and film producer. She was briefly married to American film director David Lynch, whom she collaborated with for 20 years. Sweeney worked with Lynch on several films and television series, most notably the original Twin Peaks series (1990), Lost Highway (1997), The Straight Story (1999), and Mulholland Drive (2001). Sweeney is the Dino and Martha De Laurentiis Endowed Professor in the Writing Division of the School of Cinematic Arts at the University of Southern California. She was formerly the chair of the Film Independent board of directors.

Biography

Early life
Sweeny graduated from the University of Wisconsin, Madison, with a BA in History. She earned a Certificate of Fine Arts from the Corcoran School of Fine Arts in Washington, D.C. After completing a master's in film at New York University, Sweeney worked her way up the ranks of film editing in New York and San Francisco, on films such as Reds by Warren Beatty, Tender Mercies by Bruce Beresford, Places in the Heart by Robert Benton, Little Drummer Girl by George Roy Hill, and The Mean Season by Phil Boursos.

David Lynch
From 1985 to 2006, Sweeney collaborated as producer, writer and editor with filmmaker David Lynch from Blue Velvet to Inland Empire. Her editing credits include Blue Velvet (1986), Wild at Heart (1990), Twin Peaks (1991), Industrial Symphony (1991), Twin Peaks: Fire Walk With Me (1992), On the Air (1992), Hotel Room (1993), Lost Highway (1996), The Straight Story (2000), Mulholland Drive (2001) and Baraboo (2009). Sweeney is a consulting producer/writer on Matthew Weiner's anthology series The Romanoffs.

She won the British Academy Award for Best Editing for Mulholland Drive.  As producer, she won the César Award for Best Foreign Film, and the New York Film Critics Award for Best Film. She developed, produced, wrote and edited The Straight Story, for which Richard Farnsworth received an Academy Award nomination. As producer, she won the European Film Award For Best Foreign Film, and the film received four nominations for the Independent Spirit Awards; Best Film, Best Director, Best First Screenplay and Best Actor. Her producing credits date from 1995 and include Lost Highway, The Straight Story, Mulholland Drive and Inland Empire, directed by Lynch, and  Baraboo (2009), her directorial debut based on her original screenplay.

Sweeney continued to write screenplays while collaborating with Lynch. These include The Surprise Party for Paramount Pictures, and Two Knives, a martial arts film for director Wong Kar-Wai and Fox Searchlight Pictures.

Filmmaking
She wrote, directed, produced and edited a short, silent film, In the Eye Abides the Heart, filmed in Buenos Aires, which premiered at the 2006 Venice Film Festival, then played the international festival circuit. In 2009, she went on to write, direct, produce and edit her debut feature, Baraboo, which premiered at the Edinburgh Film Festival and won Best First Feature awards at the Galway Film Fleadh and the Wisconsin Film Festival.

Sweeney has been on the board of directors of Film Independent since 2000, and was elected chair of the board in 2012.  Film Independent is a non-profit arts organization that produces the Independent Spirit Awards, the Los Angeles Film Festival, and the Film Independent Series at LACMA.

In 2003, she joined the faculty of the Division of Writing for Screen and Television in the School of Cinematic Arts at the University of Southern California. She was installed as the Dino and Martha De Laurentiis Endowed Professor in 2012.

2010-present
Between 2010-15, she was a Fulbright Film Specialist and traveled for the State Department on Fulbright grants to Jordan, Kazakhstan, Laos, Myanmar and Cuba to mentor filmmakers in those countries.

Sweeney is vice president and founding member of the DesertX non-profit Board of Directors.  DesertX was a site-specific art exhibition in the Coachella Valley, February through April, 2017.

She is a member in good standing of AMPAS, BAFTA, the DGA, and the WGA, where she is on the WGA Independent Writers Committee.

Awards and nominations
2000: The Straight Story (nominated) Independent Spirit Award Best Film (shared with Neal Edelstein) and Best First Screenplay (shared with John Roach)
2002: Mulholland Drive  (won) BAFTA Award for Best Editing
2002: Mulholland Drive  (nominated) AFI Film Award – AFI Movie of the Year (shared with producers Alain Sarde, Neal Edelstein, Michael Polaire, Tony Krantz)

Selected filmography

As film editor
Twin Peaks TV series (1 episode, season 2, 1990) (episode #2.7)
Twin Peaks: Fire Walk with Me (1992)
Hotel Room TV series (1993)
Lost Highway (1997)
The Straight Story (1999)
Mulholland Drive (2001)
Baraboo (2009)

As assistant editor
Blue Velvet (1986) (assistant editor)
Wild at Heart (1990) (first assistant film editor)

As producer
Nadja (1994)
Lost Highway (1997)
The Straight Story (1999)
Mulholland Drive (2001)
Inland Empire (2006)
Baraboo (2009)

As writer
The Straight Story (1999)
Baraboo (2009)

As director
Baraboo (2009)

References

External links
 

1953 births
Living people
American film editors
American film producers
American screenwriters
American women screenwriters
Best Editing BAFTA Award winners
American women film editors
University of Wisconsin–Madison alumni
New York University alumni